Jerry Howard Styner (born June 18, 1936) is an American songwriter, musician, and former record producer. He has written scores for or had his compositions featured in over 30 films. Some of the artists he has worked with include Chet Baker for his Blood, Chet and Tears album, Solomon Burke for his We're Almost Home album and many others. 
For several years he served as a staff minister at the Center for Spiritual Living in Palm Desert, California. He lives with his daughter in Guatemala.

Career
In the late 1950s or early 1960s, Styner went under the name of Rusty Howard and was in the music group called The Rhythm Rangers.

45 RPM
As Jerry Styner
 "In The Middle Of The Night" / "Lonely Little Girl" - Palomar 45-2206 / 45-2206V - (1965)

LP
 Jerry Styner And  Michael Lloyd – The Devil's 8 (Original Motion Picture Soundtrack) Tower – ST-5160 - (1969)
 Jerry Styner and Larry Brown  – Orbit III - Beverly Hills – BHS 38 - (1971)
 Great Balls of Fire (Mae West album)- (1972)-(recorded in 1968)-UK MGM:2315207.(The words on the lp's reverse, say: "Strings and horns arranged by Jerry Styner. Engineered by Jerry Styner. Mastered at MGM Recording Studios, Val Valentin in charge".The Mike Curb Congregation supplied the Vocal Accompaniment.

References

1936 births
Living people
American film score composers
Record producers from Los Angeles
Surf music record producers
Songwriters from California